John Brodhead may refer to:

John Curtis Brodhead (1780–1859), U.S. Representative from New York
John Romeyn Brodhead (1814–1873), American historical scholar
John Brodhead (New Hampshire politician) (1770–1838), U.S. Representative from New Hampshire
John Henry Brodhead (1898–1951), African American pioneer in the field of psychology